The Wichita Open was a golf tournament on the LPGA Tour, played only in 1954. It was played at the Wichita Country Club in Wichita, Kansas. Beverly Hanson won the event.

References

Former LPGA Tour events
Golf in Kansas
Open
1954 establishments in Kansas
1954 disestablishments in Kansas
History of women in Kansas